The 1897 Iowa Agricultural Cyclones football team represented Iowa Agricultural College (later renamed Iowa State University) as an independent during the 1897 college football season. Under head coach Pop Warner, the Cyclones compiled a 3–1 record and outscored their opponents by a combined total of 40 to 22. There was no team captain for the 1897 season.

Between 1892 and 1913, the football team played on a field that later became the site of the university's Parks Library.

Schedule

References

Iowa Agricultural
Iowa State Cyclones football seasons
Iowa Agricultural Cyclones football